The 2001 Midwestern Collegiate Conference men's basketball tournament took place at the end of the 2000–01 regular season. The tournament was hosted by Wright State University.

Seeds
All Midwestern Collegiate Conference schools played in the tournament. Teams were seeded by 2001–02 Midwestern Collegiate Conference season record, with a tiebreaker system to seed teams with identical conference records.

Bracket

References

-2001 Midwestern Collegiate Conference men's basketball tournament
Horizon League men's basketball tournament
Midwestern Collegiate Conference men's basketball tournament
Basketball competitions in Dayton, Ohio